State Route 109 (abbreviated SR 109) is a  long state highway located in York County, Maine.  Its southern terminus is at U.S. Route 1 and State Route 9 in Wells. Its northern terminus is at the New Hampshire border in Acton, where it connects to New Hampshire Route 109.  It is a multi-state route with NH 109.

NH 109 is signed as a north–south highway, but occupies a southeast-to-northwest alignment.

Major towns and cities along the length of SR 109 include Wells and Sanford.

Route description 
SR 109 begins in Wells at the southern junction of US 1 and SR 9.  It is cosigned with SR 9 for its first  and interchanges with the Maine Turnpike (I-95) at exit 19.  SR 9 splits off to the west and SR 109 crosses SR 9A before entering the city of Sanford.

In the southern end of Sanford, SR 109 intersects SR 99, then meets SR 4 at a roundabout.  SR 109 continues northwest towards downtown cosigned with SR 4A.  In downtown Sanford, SR 4A / SR 109 meets US 202 / SR 11 at Lebanon and Winter Streets.  SR 4A leaves SR 109 to join US 202 towards Alfred, while SR 11 leaves US 202 to join SR 109 northbound.  SR 11 / SR 109 continues northwest through the Springvale neighborhood, crossing SR 11A and SR 224 along the way.

SR 11 / SR 109 crosses into the town of Shapleigh, where SR 11 splits off to the north near Mousam Lake.  SR 109 continues northwest, passing through the town of Acton.  North of Acton, SR 109 crosses the Salmon Falls River into Wakefield, New Hampshire and becomes NH 109.

History 
SR 109 was designated on Maine's first state highway map in 1925 and still maintains its original routing.  Its three-digit number indicates that it was originally an intrastate route, abruptly ending at the New Hampshire state line until NH 109 was later designated.

Major intersections

See also

References

External links

Floodgap Roadgap's RoadsAroundME: Maine State Route 109

109
Transportation in York County, Maine